Pseudotephritis millepunctata is a species of ulidiid or picture-winged fly in the genus Pseudotephritis of the family Tephritidae.

Distribution
Russian Far East.

References

Ulidiidae
Insects described in 1939
Diptera of Asia
Taxa named by Willi Hennig